Mustafa Özkan (born 21 February 1975) is a former professional footballer who played as a forward.

Özkan played two seasons for Stuttgarter Kickers in the 2. Bundesliga, appearing in 20 league matches.  He also played for several clubs in Turkey, including Beşiktaş, Gençlerbirliği, Malatyaspor and MKE Ankaragücü.

Born in Germany, he made one appearance for the Turkey national team in a friendly against Ukraine on 12 February 2003.

References

External links
 Mustafa Özkans profile at TFF.org

Living people
1975 births
People from Forchheim
German people of Turkish descent
Sportspeople from Upper Franconia
German footballers
Turkish footballers
Association football forwards
Turkey international footballers
Turkey under-21 international footballers
1. FC Nürnberg players
Beşiktaş J.K. footballers
Kocaelispor footballers
Grasshopper Club Zürich players
Stuttgarter Kickers players
Göztepe S.K. footballers
Denizlispor footballers
Gençlerbirliği S.K. footballers
Malatyaspor footballers
MKE Ankaragücü footballers
Antalyaspor footballers
Süper Lig players
Mediterranean Games silver medalists for Turkey
Competitors at the 1997 Mediterranean Games
Footballers from Bavaria
Mediterranean Games medalists in football
German expatriate sportspeople in Switzerland
Turkish expatriate sportspeople in Switzerland
German expatriate footballers
Turkish expatriate footballers
Expatriate footballers in Switzerland